Lyubomir Danilovich Kantonistov (born 11 August 1978) is a former Russian footballer.

He played with FC Lokomotiv Moscow, FC Kuban Krasnodar and FC Torpedo Moscow in the Russian Premier League, and with Olimpija Ljubljana in the Slovenian First League.

International career
Kantonistov played his first (and so far, only) game for Russia on 9 October 2004 in the 2006 FIFA World Cup qualifier against Luxembourg.

References
 Profile on the Torpedo Moscow Site
  Profile
 

1978 births
Living people
Footballers from Moscow
Russian footballers
Russian expatriate footballers
Russia international footballers
Association football midfielders
FC Lokomotiv Moscow players
FC Zhemchuzhina Sochi players
FC Spartak Vladikavkaz players
FC Kuban Krasnodar players
FC Torpedo Moscow players
FC Dynamo Saint Petersburg players
FC Lokomotiv Nizhny Novgorod players
Russian Premier League players
NK Olimpija Ljubljana (1945–2005) players
Expatriate footballers in Slovenia
FC Krasnodar players
FC Baltika Kaliningrad players
FC Fakel Voronezh players
FC Yenisey Krasnoyarsk players
FC Neftekhimik Nizhnekamsk players
FC MVD Rossii Moscow players